Louis Étienne Joseph Marie de La Vallée-Poussin (1 January 1869 – 18 February 1938) was a Belgian Indologist and scholar of Buddhist Studies.

Biography
La Vallée-Poussin was born in Liège, where he received his early education. He studied at the University of Liège from 1884 to 1888, receiving his doctorate at the age of nineteen. He studied Sanskrit, Pali, and Avestan under Charles de Harlez and Philippe Colinet from 1888 to 1890 at the University of Louvain, receiving a docteur en langues orientales in July 1891. Moving to Paris, he began his studies at the Sorbonne that same year under Victor Henri and Sylvain Lévi. During this time (1891–1892), he also occupied the chair of Sanskrit at the University of Liège. He continued his study of Avestan and the Zoroastrian Gathas under Hendrik Kern at Leiden University, where he also took up the study of Chinese and Tibetan. In 1893, he attained a professorship at the University of Ghent teaching comparative grammar of Greek and Latin, a position which he held until his retirement in 1929.

Louis de La Vallée-Poussin died on February 18, 1938, in Brussels, Belgium at the age of 69.

Musila et Nārada
In 1937 La Vallée-Poussin published Musila et Nārada, an influential study on two ways of attaining nirvana, exemplified by the monks Musila and Nārada.

Major works
 Nirvana
 La Morale bouddhique
 Documents d'Abhidharma : La controverse du temps, des dieux, les quatre, les trois vérités
 L’Abhidharmakośa de Vasubandhu. 6 vols. Paris: 1923–31.
 Vijñaptimātratāsiddhi: La Siddhi de Hiuan-Tsang, (1928–1929)
 L'Inde aux temps des mauryas et des Barbares, Grecs, Scythes, Parthes et Yue-Tchi
 Dynasties et histoire de l'Inde depuis Kanişka jusqu'aux invasions musulmanes (1935)
 Bouddhisme. Opinions sur l'histoire de la dogmatique
 Indo-européens et indo-iraniens. L'Inde jusque vers 300 avant J.-C, (1924)

See also
La Vallée-Poussin

References

Sources

Further reading
Musila et Nārada
 La Vallee Possin (1937), Musila et Narada; reprinted in Gombrich (2006), How Buddhism Began, appendix
 Erich Frauwallner (1953), Geschichte der indischen Philosophie, Band  Der Buddha und der Jina (pp. 147–272)
 Andre Bareau (1963), Recherches sur la biographie du Buddha dans les Sutrapitaka et les Vinayapitaka anciens, Ecole Francaise d'Extreme-Orient
 Donald K. Swearer (1972), Two Types of Saving Knowledge in the Pāli Suttas, Philosophy East and West, Vol. 22, No. 4 (Oct., 1972), pp. 355–371 
 Schmithausen, On some Aspects of Descriptions or Theories of 'Liberating Insight' and 'Enlightenment' in Early Buddhism. In: Studien zum Jainismus und Buddhismus (Gedenkschrift für Ludwig Alsdorf), hrsg. von Klaus Bruhn und Albrecht Wezler, Wiesbaden 1981, 199–250.
 
 K.R. Norman, [https://web.archive.org/web/20160309183447/http://ahandfulofleaves.org/documents/articles/the%20four%20noble%20truths_norman_pts_2003.pdf Four Noble Truths]
 , chapter 8
 Tilman Vetter, The Ideas and Meditative Practices of Early Buddhism, by Tilmann Vetter
 , chapter four
 
 Alexander Wynne (2007), The Origin of Buddhist Meditation, Routledge

External links
 
 The way to Nirvana : six lectures on ancient Buddhism as a discipline of salvation on archive.org
 Nécrologie : Louis de La Vallée-Poussin.  Bulletin de l'École française d'Extrême-Orient'', année 1938, volume 38, pp. 479–483

Belgian Indologists
1869 births
1938 deaths
Pali
University of Liège alumni
Catholic University of Leuven (1834–1968) alumni
Buddhist studies scholars
Translators from Sanskrit
Academic staff of the University of Liège
Corresponding members of the Saint Petersburg Academy of Sciences
Corresponding Members of the Russian Academy of Sciences (1917–1925)
Corresponding Members of the USSR Academy of Sciences